Ryann Krais (born March 21, 1990) is an American athlete. She is a gold and bronze medalist from the 2007 World Youth Championships.

Personal 
Ryann Krais was born in Philadelphia, Pennsylvania on March 21, 1990, the daughter of John and Janelle Krais. Her father is an engineer and her mother is a Lutheran pastor. She has two siblings, one brother (J.J. Krais) and one sister (Julie Krais). She is a 2008 graduate of Methacton High School in Norristown, Pennsylvania where she was a nine-time outdoor state champion and a five-time indoor state champion. Krais graduated from Kansas State University in 2012.

Career 
Ryann finished 12th 2014 USA Outdoor Track and Field Championships scoring 5549 points.

Krais finished 4th 2013 USATF Senior Women's Heptathlon scoring 5957 points.

Krais finished 7th in the 2012 Olympic Trials.

Krais is the 2011 NCAA champion in the Heptathlon, and also placed third in the 400 hurdles. She is a seven-time collegiate All-American, and four-time conference champion. At the 2011 USA Outdoor Track & Field Championships, Krais finished second in the heptathlon with a points total of 6030, finishing behind Sharon Day. She has also been recognized for her academic accomplishments as well.

Krais is a two time US Junior champion in the Heptathlon (2008 and 2009).

At the 2009 Pan American Junior Athletics Championships, Krais won a silver medal in the heptathlon, finishing behind Vanessa Spinola of Brazil.

A year later, at the 2008 World Junior Championships in Athletics in Bydgoszcz, Krais placed 9th in the heptathlon with 5457 points. Krais then went on to compete at the 2008 Olympic Trials in the 400 m hurdles. However, she did not advance past the heats.

At the 2007 World Youth Championships in Athletics in Ostrava, Krais combined with Chalonda Goodman, Ashton Purvis, and Erica Alexander to win gold ahead of Jamaica and Canada in the medley relay. She also won a bronze medal in the 400 m hurdles.

References

External links 

 
 
 Ryann Krais at Kansas State
 Ryann Krais at UCLA
 Ryann Krais at AthleteBiz.us
 

Living people
1990 births
American female hurdlers
American heptathletes
Kansas State University alumni
Track and field athletes from Philadelphia
UCLA Bruins women's track and field athletes
20th-century American women
21st-century American women